John Crispe (died 1501) was an English landowner and politician from Kent.

Probably the John Crispe mentioned in the 1619 Visitation of Kent, he was a MP of the Parliament of England for Canterbury in 1489. His grandson was the MP Henry Crispe.

References

English MPs 1489